The Peptostreptococcaceae are a family of  Gram-positive bacteria in the class Clostridia.

Several members of the Peptostreptococcaceae are well known inhabitants of the digestive tract. 
Microbiome studies of animal feces have corroborated this. Notably, an unclassified group of Peptostreptococcaceae has been reported making up a significant portion of the microbial community in domestic cats, while other studies have not found a significant presence of Peptostreptococcaceae.

Clostridioides difficile is a notable human pathogen in this family. Peptostreptococcaceae have been of interest for several other bowel diseases as biological marker or causative agent. Decreased abundance has been reported for Crohn's disease, while the genus Peptostreptococcus appears to be more common in patients diagnosed with colorectal cancer.

References 

Taxa described in 2010